The Hidden Lore is an EP by Danish death metal band Iniquity released in May 1998. It was recorded by a completely new line-up since the band's first studio album Serenadium in 1996.

Track listing
 "Desiderated Profligacy" - 5:25
 "Notable Diversity" - 5:05
 "Achromatic Chronicles" - 4:33
 "The Hidden Lore" - 5:45

Credits
Brian Eriksen - Guitar
Jens Lee - Guitar
Martin Rosendahl - Bass, vocals
Jesper Frost Jensen - drums
Jacob Hansen - Producer, Mixing
Recorded by Lars Schmidt at the Soundzone Studio

References

Iniquity (band) albums
1998 EPs
Albums produced by Jacob Hansen